Jukebox is the third studio album by English boy band JLS, released on 11 November 2011 through Epic Records. The album's release was preceded by the lead single "She Makes Me Wanna", which debuted at number one on the UK Singles Chart in July 2011, and the second single, "Take a Chance on Me", released on 4 November 2011. The single charted at number two in the British charts. The album was issued in four exclusive different editions through music retailer HMV, each containing a slipcase portraying a different member of the band on the artwork.

Background
The band began recording their third studio album in April 2011, and stated that they had co-written 16 tracks that could possibly appear. In June 2011, the band announced that they had finished recording the album, and that out of a possible 30 songs, had to decide which tracks would appear on the album. The band stated at the time that they had been recording collaborations with Bruno Mars, Rihanna, Usher and Craig David - however, none of these appear on the album. The album's lead single, "She Makes Me Wanna", a collaboration with American singer Dev, was released on 24 July 2011, peaking at #1 on the UK Singles Chart and de-throning fellow boyband The Wanted's second number one single, "Glad You Came".
The album's second single, "Take A Chance On Me", was premiered on 20 September, with band member Oritse commenting, "It's the most personal song we've ever done." The group will tour the United Kingdom in 2012 promoting the album, with more than 20 dates confirmed for their 4th Dimension Tour, due to start in March 2012.

Singles
 "She Makes Me Wanna" was released on 25 July 2011 as the lead single from the album. The single debuted at number one on the UK Singles Chart, with first-week sales of 98,000 copies. In Ireland, the song peaked at number two.
 "Take a Chance on Me" was released on 6 November 2011, as the second single from the album. It debuted at number two on the UK Singles Chart selling over 62,000 in its first week, making it JLS's eighth top-ten single. In Ireland, the song peaked at number 13.
 "Do You Feel What I Feel?" was released on 1 January 2012, as the third single from the album. The song samples Bing Crosby's classic festive hit "Do You Hear What I Hear?". The single only managed to peak at number 16 on the UK Singles Chart making it their lowest peaking single at the time. However the music video won Best Video at the MOBO Awards 2012.

Critical reception

The album received mixed-to-positive reviews from critics. Lewis Corner of Digital Spy gave the album three out of five stars, stating: "A handful of number one singles, a string of sold-out tours and a third album equals JLS becoming the success story from The X Factor. But with big expectations to live up to and even bigger competition in the form of The Wanted and One Direction, is their latest effort Jukebox enough to cement their status as the UK's premier boyband? Summer cut 'She Makes Me Wanna' heads up the set with RedOne-helmed Euro-club beats, while seasonal follow-up 'Take A Chance On Me' is a heart-warming slice of R&B sweet-nothings. In keeping with JLS's strict annual criteria, the remainder of the record continues to evoke the group's own mix of street-wise uptempos and swoon-worthy ballads. 'Do You Feel What I Feel?' satisfies the guys' penchant for sampling a classic by retweaking a Bing Crosby hit to suit their 18-30's party lifestyle, while 'So Many Girls' hears them scouting dancefloors to find 'the one' over a familiar-sounding chorus straight from the '90s - complete with a cheeky nod to B*Witched. That said, there's a liberal sprinkling of duff notes to be found among the party anthems. '3D' is a techno-snooze affair with predictable lyrics, and 'Shy Of The Cool' is a pan-flat composition of sullen strings that closes the record with the kind of enthusiasm felt before a maths GCSE exam. Unfortunately, the final result is much the same; while the record has its full-marks pop ditties, the majority leaves you feeling that JLS could have put in a little extra revision time."

Track listings

"Do You Feel What I Feel?" incorporates elements of "Do You Hear What I Hear?" written by Gloria Shayne Baker and Tebey Ottoh.

Charts and certifications

Weekly charts

Year-end charts

Certifications

Release history

References

2011 albums
Epic Records albums
Albums produced by Cutfather
JLS albums
Albums produced by Harmony Samuels